Christopher Robert Mason (born April 20, 1976) is a Canadian former professional ice hockey goaltender. He most recently played with Augsburger Panther of the Deutsche Eishockey Liga (DEL). He previously played for four different National Hockey League (NHL) teams. Mason currently serves as the colour analyst covering Predators games broadcast on Bally Sports South.

Playing career
While completing a junior career in the Western Hockey League (WHL) with the Prince George Cougars, Mason was originally drafted 122nd overall in the 1995 NHL Entry Draft by the New Jersey Devils. Embarking on his professional career and un-signed from the Devils, Mason signed as a free agent by the Mighty Ducks of Anaheim on June 27, 1997. After his rookie professional season with the Ducks' American Hockey League (AHL) affiliate, the Cincinnati Mighty Ducks, and on the eve of his sophomore season, Mason was traded by Anaheim along with Marc Moro to the Nashville Predators in exchange for Dominic Roussel.

Mason made his debut in the NHL with the Predators during the 1998–99 season, relieving in three games. After a further three seasons within the Predators organization, Mason left as a free agent and signed a contract with the Florida Panthers. Mason was assigned to Florida's AHL affiliate, the San Antonio Rampage, for the duration of the 2002–03 season. He re-signed with the Panthers to a one-year extension, however he never featured for the club before he was claimed in the 2003 NHL waiver draft to return to the Nashville Predators.

In the 2003–04 season, Mason joined the Predators full-time as the backup to starter Tomáš Vokoun. In 17 appearances that season, Mason finished with a 4–4–1 record with a 2.18 goals against average (GAA) and .926 save percentage.

During the 2004–05 NHL lockout, Mason played for Vålerenga Ishockey in the Norwegian league with fellow Predator Scott Hartnell. Being hailed as the best goalie in the league ever, he played a big part in Vålerenga securing their 25th league championship and their 24th Norwegian Championship by winning the playoffs.

On April 15, 2006, when he was starting because starting goaltender Vokoun was lost for the year with a blood condition, Mason was credited for a goal when Phoenix Coyotes forward Geoff Sanderson shot the puck into his own net. Mason became the ninth NHL goaltender to score a goal and joined Damian Rhodes as the only goalies to be credited with a goal in both the AHL and the NHL.

In response, Mason said, "It was a cheesy goal. Someone else should have received it."

In the off-season of 2007, Vokoun was traded to the Florida Panthers for a few draft picks, leaving Mason as the starter for Nashville, alone with backup goaltender Dan Ellis. Mason quickly won the first two games, the collective scores of which were 9–1 in favor of the Predators, but then dropped a startling seven straight games. Dan Ellis, however, was able to step up for the Predators and win four straight. Mason returned to play against the Detroit Red Wings in a 43-save loss. The loss was no surprise, but Mason did show that he could effectively remain the Nashville starter, and continued to start for the remainder of his time with the Predators.

On June 20, 2008, Mason was traded by the Predators to the St. Louis Blues for a fourth round draft pick. In two seasons as the Blues number one goalie, Mason appeared in career high 61 and 57 games, to post 27 and 30 wins respectively.

On July 1, 2010, Mason left the Blues and signed a two-year, $3.7 million deal with the Atlanta Thrashers, marking the first time in his NHL career that Mason played for an Eastern Conference team. Mason's 2010–11 campaign was a disappointment, as it marked the first time in his career that he posted a GAA above 3.00. Following the team's relocation, Mason played out the second season of his contract for the Winnipeg Jets.

On July 1, 2012, Mason returned for a third stint with the Nashville Predators, on a one-year deal to serve as the team's backup goalie. During the lockout shortened 2012–13 season, Mason was unable to recapture his earlier career form posting a career low goals against and save percentage.

With limited NHL interest at season's end, Mason signed abroad in Italy to a one-year contract with Ritten-Renon of the Elite.A on August 6, 2013. After a successful season in Italy, on May 23, 2014, he moved to Germany to sign a one-year contract with the Augsburger Panther of the Deutsche Eishockey Liga (DEL).

On September 21, 2015, Mason announced his retirement from professional hockey and that he would be joining the Nashville Predators Radio Network as a colour commentator for select games during the 2015–16 season.

International play

 

Mason made his international debut with Canada at the 2006 World Championships but did not play.  He won a gold medal with team Canada at the 2007 World Championships as a third goaltender. He played his first game at the 2009 World Championships in Switzerland where he went 4–0 with a 1.00 GAA, and helped Canada to a silver medal.

Based on the strong performance in 2009 World Championships and in the NHL regular season leading up to the Olympics, Mason was selected as a reserve by Team Canada for the 2010 Winter Olympics as a stand-by goaltender should an injury occur. He would play as the starting goaltender at the 2010 World Championships in Germany, where they lost against Team Russia in the quarter-finals.  Mason also played for Team Canada at the 2013 Spengler Cup.

Career statistics

Regular season and playoffs

International

Awards
 Air Canada Cup Top Goaltender in 1994
 Norwegian GET-ligaen All-Star Team in 2004–05.
 GET-ligaen champion with Vålerenga in 2004–05.
 Norwegian Champion with Vålerenga in 2004–05.

References

External links
 

1976 births
Living people
Atlanta Thrashers players
Augsburger Panther players
Canadian ice hockey goaltenders
Cincinnati Mighty Ducks players
Sportspeople from Red Deer, Alberta
Milwaukee Admirals players
Nashville Predators players
National Hockey League goaltenders who have scored in a game
New Jersey Devils draft picks
Prince George Cougars players
St. Louis Blues players
San Antonio Rampage players
Ritten Sport players
Vålerenga Ishockey players
Victoria Cougars (WHL) players
Winnipeg Jets players
Ice hockey people from Alberta
Canadian expatriate ice hockey players in Norway
Canadian expatriate ice hockey players in Italy
Canadian expatriate ice hockey players in Germany
Canadian expatriate ice hockey players in the United States